Mesoleuctra is a genus of stoneflies that lived in the Jurassic period.

Species included:
†Mesoleuctra brachypoda 
†Mesoleuctra exserta
†Mesoleuctra gigantea
†Mesoleuctra gracilis
†Mesoleuctra peipiaoensis
†Mesoleuctra quadrata
†Mesoleuctra tibialis

References

Jurassic insects
Plecoptera
Jurassic insects of Asia
Prehistoric insect genera